Ruby is a hamlet (and census-designated place) in Ulster County, New York, United States. Ruby has a post office with ZIP code 12475, which opened on June 2, 1896. The population was 918 at the 2020 census.

One-time major league baseball player Dutch Schirick was born in Ruby on June 15, 1890. In 1921, he organized the semi-professional Kingston Colonels team. Schirick  went on to become a Supreme Court judge in Kingston.

The Roman Catholic Church of St. Wendelinus was founded as a mission station of St. Peter's in Rondoubt. By 1914, it had become a mission of St. Ann's in Sawkill. At that time, the congregation, of English and German descent, numbered approximately 60.

Geography
According to the United States Census Bureau, the CDP has a total area of 0.701 square miles (3.1 km2), of which 0.7 square miles (2.5 km2) is land and 0.001 square mile (0.6 km2)  (0.14%) is water.

Demographics

2020 census
As of the 2020 census, the population was 918. The racial makeup of the town was 87.69% White, 2.07% Black or African American, 0.00% Native American, 1.42% Asian, 0.00% Pacific Islander, 2.40% from other races, and 6.43% from two or more races. Hispanic or Latino of any race were 6.43% of the population.

References

Hamlets in Ulster County, New York
Hamlets in New York (state)